The 2018 Northeast Conference women's soccer tournament was the postseason women's soccer tournament for the Northeast Conference held on November 2 and 4, 2018. The three-match tournament took place at Central Connecticut Soccer Field in New Britain, Connecticut, home of the regular season champions and tournament #1 seed Central Connecticut State Blue Devils. The four-team single-elimination tournament consisted of two rounds based on seeding from regular season conference play. The defending champions were the Saint Francis Red Flash but they were unable to defend their title, losing 2–1 in the final to Central Connecticut. This was the ninth Northeast Conference tournament title for the Central Connecticut women's soccer program, seven of which have come under the direction of head coach Mick D'Arcy.

Bracket

Schedule

Semifinals

Final

Statistics

Goalscorers 
3 Goals
 Danielle Pearse - Central Connecticut

2 Goals
 Sara Suler - St. Francis

1 Goal
 Emilee Barnett - St. Francis
 Jackson Bennett - Fairleigh Dickinson
 Jenna Rae Covello - Central Connecticut
 Dakota Graham - St. Francis
 Corinne Renninger - St. Francis

All-Tournament team

Source:

See also 
 Northeast Conference
 2018 NCAA Division I women's soccer season
 2018 NCAA Division I Women's Soccer Tournament

References

External links 
2018 Northeast Conference Women's Soccer Tournament

Northeast Conference Women's Soccer Tournament
2018 Northeast Conference women's soccer season